St. Charles Car Company, a railroad rolling stock manufacturing company located in St. Charles, Missouri, was founded in 1872 or 1873. In 1899 it merged with twelve other companies to form American Car and Foundry (ACF). The St. Charles plant became the main passenger car works. With a failing market for steel passenger cars, ACF phased out the St. Charles operation in 1959.

Its extant buildings are located in the Frenchtown Historic District.

See also
List of rolling stock manufacturers

References

External links
History of the company—ironhorse129
Historical pictures of the facility—Progressive St. Charles 1916
Historical pictures and sketches of the product—St. Charles Library District

Defunct rolling stock manufacturers of the United States
American Car and Foundry Company
St. Charles County, Missouri
Manufacturing companies established in 1873
Manufacturing companies disestablished in 1899
1873 establishments in Missouri
1899 disestablishments in Missouri
Defunct manufacturing companies based in Missouri